As Days Get Dark is the seventh studio album by Scottish indie rock band Arab Strap, released on 15 March 2021 on Rock Action.

It is their first album in 16 years (since The Last Romance) and their first since officially reforming in 2016.

Overview
The usual lyrical preoccupations of Arab Strap - depravity, drinking and despair - are in evidence on As Days Get Dark, with allusions to voodoo ritual (The Turning of the Bones) and Greek mythology (Here Comes Comus!) alongside commentaries on immigration (Fable of the Urban Fox), social media (Bluebird), and emotional burnout (Tears on Tour).

Artwork
The album art depicts a personal computer desktop with two windows open, both displaying images. The 1886 painting "The Night Escorted by the Geniuses of Love and Study" by Pedro Américo is foregrounded, but clearly obscures a presumably pornographic image of a reclining figure clad in nylons and little if anything else. The back cover is similar, with what appears to be the same image this time obscured by both the tracklisting (in a bespoke Microsoft Word) and Lorenzo Costa's "The Reign of Comus".

Reception

As Days Get Dark was received positively, with some reviewers describing it as the band's best work.

Track listing

Charts

References

2021 albums
Arab Strap (band) albums
Rock Action Records albums